Thomas Joseph McGrath (January 15, 1859January 29, 1920) was a Canadian American immigrant, contractor, and Republican politician.  He was a member of the Wisconsin State Assembly, representing the city of Green Bay and northwest Brown County during the 1897 and 1899 sessions.  His name was often abbreviated as T. J. McGrath.

Biography
Thomas J. McGrath was born in Victoria County, Upper Canada, in January 1859.  He was raised and educated there and emigrated to Wisconsin in December 1875.  He lived in Waupaca County, Wisconsin, for two years, then moved to Minnesota in 1877, where he remained until 1888, working as a laborer and carpenter.  In 1888 he moved to Green Bay, Wisconsin, where he operated as a general contractor for forty years.

He was active with the Republican Party of Wisconsin and was elected on the Republican ticket to the Wisconsin State Assembly in 1896.  He represented Brown County's first Assembly district, which then comprised Green Bay and the northwest corner of the county.  He went on to win re-election in 1898, serving in the 1897 and 1899 sessions of the Legislature.

He was one of the primary construction contractors on the building of the Green Bay Masonic Temple, now referred to as the Northeast Wisconsin Masonic Center and was active in Freemasonry.

He left Wisconsin in 1915, moving to Gordonsville, Virginia, and from there moved to Danville, Illinois, about 1918.  He died at his home in Danville in January 1920.

Electoral history

Wisconsin Assembly (1896, 1898)

| colspan="6" style="text-align:center;background-color: #e9e9e9;"| General Election, November 3, 1896 

 
 

| colspan="6" style="text-align:center;background-color: #e9e9e9;"| General Election, November 8, 1898

References

1859 births
1920 deaths
Canadian emigrants to the United States
People from Green Bay, Wisconsin
People from Danville, Illinois
Republican Party members of the Wisconsin State Assembly
19th-century American politicians